The 1977–78 season was Leeds United's fourteenth consecutive season in the Football League First Division. Along with the First Division, they also competed in the FA Cup and the Football League Cup.

Background 
Following the 1973–74 season, Revie left Leeds and Elland Road to manage the England national team. Brian Clough was appointed as Revie's successor. This was a surprise appointment, as Clough had been an outspoken critic of Revie and the team's tactics. Clough's tenure as manager started badly, with defeat in the Charity Shield Match against Liverpool in which Billy Bremner and Kevin Keegan were sent off for fighting. Under Clough, the team performed poorly, and after only 44 days he was dismissed.

Clough was replaced by former England captain Jimmy Armfield. Armfield took Revie's ageing team to the final of the 1974–75 European Cup, in which they were defeated by Bayern Munich under controversial circumstances. Assisted by coach Don Howe, Armfield rebuilt Revie's team, and though it no longer dominated English football, Leeds finished 5th in the 1975–76 season and 10th in 1976–77.

Season summary 
1977-78 proved to be another decent, but unexceptional season, with the highlight being a run to the semi-finals of the Football League Cup, albeit it ended in a 7-3 aggregate loss to eventual Division One champions Nottingham Forest. Leeds's league form was for the most part better than in the previous season, keeping them in the hunt for a UEFA Cup space until the latter stages of the campaign, but a poor end saw them finish in ninth place after winning just one of their last seven games. This caused the club's board to run out of patience with manager Jimmy Armfield, who was dismissed weeks after the season ended and replaced, after an unsuccessful attempt to recruit Southampton manager Lawrie McMenemy, by former Celtic manager Jock Stein.

Competitions

Football League First Division

League table

Matches 

Source:

FA Cup 

Source:

Football League Cup 

Source:

Statistics

Appearances and goals

Notes

References

Leeds United F.C. seasons
Leeds United
1970s in Leeds